Komárek (feminine Komárková) is a Czech surname meaning "little mosquito". Notable people include:

 Božena Komárková, Czech philosopher and theologian
 Jiří Komárek (b.1931), phycologist with the botanical abbreviation "Komárek"
 Karel Komárek (born 1969), Czech billionaire
 Konstantin Komarek, Austrian ice hockey player
 Lukáš Komárek, Slovak ice hockey player
 Martin Komárek, Czech footballer
 Miroslav Komárek, Czech linguist
 Valtr Komárek, Czech politician
 Věra Komárková, Czech mountaineer

Czech-language surnames